Bukowiec  (Bukovets’) is a village in the administrative district of Gmina Solina, within Lesko County, Subcarpathian Voivodeship, in south-eastern Poland.

References

Bukowiec